Guston is a rural unincorporated community in Meade County, Kentucky, United States.  It is a small unincorporated community that lies a few miles southwest of Brandenburg on KY 428, near its intersection with KY 710.

A post office was established in the community in 1889. Guston was named for area resident Gustavia "Gus" W. Richardson.  The ZIP Code for Guston is 40142.

Geography

References
  

Unincorporated communities in Meade County, Kentucky
Louisville metropolitan area
Unincorporated communities in Kentucky